(also known by its French title "La Solitude de l'aube") is a song by Japanese musician Ringo Sheena. It was released as one of the A-sides of her 14th single, along with the song "Irohanihoheto", released on May 27, 2013. The release date was the 15th anniversary of the release of Sheena's debut single "Kōfukuron" in 1998.

Background and development 

In early 2012, Sheena's band Tokyo Jihen disbanded, and released a string of releases, including the extended play Color Bars, the live compilation album Tokyo Collection, the B-side collection Shin'ya Waku, and performed their farewell tour, Bon Voyage. On May 16, 2012, Sheena released her first post-Tokyo Jihen solo work, the digital single "Jiyū e Michizure." This song acted as the theme song for the TBS drama Ataru, starring Masahiro Nakai.

It was later revealed that Sheena was heavily pregnant with her second child during the single's release. As she did not feel it was appropriate to link single promotions with the birth of a child, she waited until her Tōtaikai concerts in November to reveal this.

Writing and production 

Sheena worked together with producer and guitarist Yukio Nagoshi on the song, as well as "Irohanihoheto". Sheena had previously worked with Nagoshi during her Ringo Expo concerts in 2008, and on the songs "Zero Chiten Kara," "Togatta Teguchi" and "Yokyō" on her solo album Sanmon Gossip (2009). Her previous Tokyo Jihen bandmate Ichiyo Izawa played the harpsichord on "Irohanihoheto." Bassist Hitoshi Watanabe had previously worked with Sheena as a member of Bōtoku Vitamin, one of the bands who performed on her album Utaite Myōri: Sono Ichi (2002). Drummer Noriyasu Kawamura previously worked with Sheena on her debut album Muzai Moratorium (1999).

"Kodoku no Akatsuki" is a song featuring lyrics written by screenwriter Aya Watanabe, who wrote the screenplay for the NHK morning drama Carnation. This is the first time Sheena did not write the lyrics to a promoted single track. The pair had worked together on Carnation, as Sheena had written the eponymous theme song, but had never met face to face before. After being asked to write a theme song for an NHK show called Switch Interview: Tatsujintachi, Sheena was inspired by the concept of the program, in which a team of interviewers ask and debate topics. She wanted to express this teamwork nature in the song, so asked Watanabe to write the lyrics. She came up with the melody for the song after hearing her son and her elementary school age niece singing the children's song "Kaijū no Ballad."

Promotion and release 

The song was released a month after the single's first A-side, "Irohanihoheto", was made available for download digitally. "Kodoku no Akatsuki" was used as the theme show for the NHK Educational TV program Switch Interview: Tatsujintachi. During Sheena's Tōtaikai concerts in November 2013, Sheena performed an English language version of "Kodoku no Akatsuki".

Critical reception 

OK Music reviewers felt that "Kodoku no Akatsuki"'s "sentimental lyrics and electric piano are impressive", believing that it would be a popular song at Sheena's live concerts.

Track listing

Personnel

Personnel details were sourced from the liner notes booklets of "Irohanihoheto/Kodoku no Akatsuki" and Hi Izuru Tokoro.

Single version

Performers and musicians

Hirohisa Horie – Wurlitzer electric piano
Noriyasu Kawamura – drums
Yukio Nagoshi – guitars, electric sitar
Ringo Sheena – vocals, chorus, songwriting
Hitoshi Watanabe – bass

Technical and production

Uni Inoue – recording engineer, mixing engineer
Shohei Kojima – assistant engineer
Kozo Miyamoto – assistant engineer
Shigeo Miyamoto – mastering engineer
Fumio Miyata – musician coordinator
Hiroshi Satō – assistant engineer
Yuji Tanaka – instrument technician

Nobuneko version

Performers and musicians

Masato Abe – cello
Tomoyuki Asakawa – harp 
Great Eida – concertmaster
Hirohito Furugawara – viola 
Shigeki Ippon – contrabass
Akane Irie – violin
Yuri Kaji – viola
Ayano Kasahara – cello
Tsukasa Kasuya – violin
Nagisa Kiriyama – violin 
Takashi Konno – contrabass
Ayumu Koshikawa – violin
Minoru Kuwata – violin
Yoshihiko Maeda – cello
Erika Makioka – cello
Kioko Miki – violin
Shōko Miki – viola
Mariko Muranaka – cello
Nobuhiko Nakayama – programming
Yuki Nanjo – violin
Tatsuo Ogura – violin 
Sachie Onuma – viola
Takayuki Oshikane – violin
Neko Saito – conductor, string arrangement, solo violin
Teruhiko Saitō – contrabass
Ringo Sheena – arrangement, MIDI
Kojiro Takizawa – violin
Takashi Taninaka – contrabass
Seigen Tokuzawa – cello
Chizuko Tsunoda – violin
Leina Ushiyama – violin
Amiko Watabe – viola
Yūji Yamada – viola
Daisuke Yamamoto – violin
Haruko Yano – violin
Tomoko Yokota – violin

Chart rankings

Sales

Release history

References 

2013 songs
2013 singles
Japanese-language songs
Ringo Sheena songs
Songs written by Ringo Sheena
EMI Music Japan singles